The McDonough Nunataks are a small group of isolated rock nunataks at the southern margin of the Queen Maud Mountains, Antarctica, rising above the ice plateau  west of Mount Rosenwald. They were named by the Advisory Committee on Antarctic Names for John W. McDonough, a United States Antarctic Research Program ionospheric physicist at the South Pole Station, 1962.

References

Nunataks of the Ross Dependency
Dufek Coast